Hoseynabad-e Saghar (also Romanized as Ḩoseynābād-e Sāghar; also known as Ḩoseynābād Sāgharī) is a village in Howmeh Rural District, in the Central District of Shahrud County, Semnan Province, Iran. At the 2006 census, its population was 53, in 14 families.

References 

Populated places in Shahrud County